Sunshine Superman: The Very Best of Donovan is a compilation album from Scottish singer-songwriter Donovan. It was released on 8 October 2002 (EMI 540777).

History
In 2002, EMI assembled a compilation of Donovan's recordings from the 1960s and titled it Sunshine Superman: The Very Best of Donovan.  This compilation has little in common with any of Donovan's other albums titled Sunshine Superman and little in common with any of Donovan's other albums titled The Best of Donovan and The Very Best of Donovan.

Track listing
All tracks by Donovan Leitch.
"Sunshine Superman" – 4:33
"Mellow Yellow" – 3:39
"Catch the Wind" – 2:55
"There Is a Mountain" – 2:35
"Colours" – 2:45
"Jennifer Juniper" – 2:42
"The Trip" – 4:34
"Sunny Goodge Street" – 2:55
"Happiness Runs" – 3:25
"Poor Cow" – 2:57
"Preachin' Love" – 2:40
"Hurdy Gurdy Man" – 3:13
"Superlungs My Supergirl" – 2:40
"Season of the Witch" – 4:55
"Turquoise" – 3:30
"Epistle to Dippy" – 3:10
"Sand and Foam" – 3:19
"Atlantis" – 4:59
"Guinevere" – 3:40
"Wear Your Love Like Heaven" – 2:24
"Barabajagal (Love Is Hot)" – 3:21
"Laleña" – 2:54

References

External links
  Sunshine Superman: The Very Best Of Donovan – Donovan Unofficial Site

2002 greatest hits albums
Donovan compilation albums